Armed Forces Institute of Pathology is a medical research laboratory of the Bangladesh Armed Forces. It is the premier diagnostic institution of Bangladesh Armed Forces. It is situated in Dhaka Cantonment. Major General Nishat Jubaida is the current Commandant of this institution.



History 
Armed Forces Institute of Pathology was established as a small laboratory designated as Army Pathological Laboratory (APL) in 1951 as part of the Pakistan Army. After the Independence of Bangladesh it became part of Bangladesh Army. In 1974 APL was restructured and re-equipped with modern equipment. In 1987, the institute was awarded the Independence Day Award. In 1991 Army Pathological Laboratory  was renamed to Armed Forces Institute of Pathology. This Institute is recognized by the Bangladesh College of Physicians and Surgeons (BCPS), University of Dhaka, Bangabandhu Sheikh Mujib Medical University (BSMMU) and also by Bangladesh University of Professionals (BUP) for postgraduate studies and training.

References

Bangladesh University of Professionals
1974 establishments in Bangladesh
Medical and health organisations based in Bangladesh
Organisations based in Dhaka
Bangladesh Armed Forces education and training establishments
Military medical organizations
Pathology organizations
Educational Institutions affiliated with Bangladesh Army